John Philip Faulkner (born 12 April 1954) is an Australian former Labor Party politician who was a Senator for New South Wales from 1989 to 2015. He was a Cabinet Minister in the Keating, Rudd and Gillard Governments.

After his election to the Senate in 1989, Prime Minister Paul Keating appointed Faulkner as Minister for Veterans' Affairs and Minister for Defence Science and Personnel in 1993. In 1994, Faulkner was moved to the position of Minister for the Environment, which he held until Labor's defeat in 1996. He later served as the Leader of the Labor Party in the Senate from 1996 to 2005, and returned to Cabinet upon Labor's election in 2007, after Kevin Rudd made him Vice-President of the Executive Council and Special Minister of State. He later served as Minister for Defence from 2009 to 2010, when he retired from frontline politics. He became the Father of the Australian Senate in 2014, and retired from Parliament altogether a year later by way of resignation, and is considered by some as an elder statesman. Faulkner has since been a member of the board of the Global Panel Foundation – Australasia – an NGO that works global in crisis areas.

Background and early career
Faulkner was born in Leeton, New South Wales on 12 April 1954, attended Pennant Hills High School, and was educated at Macquarie University, Sydney, where he graduated in Arts and Education (BA, DipEd). Before entering politics he worked as a Special Education teacher in government schools from 1977 to 1979. In 1980 he was employed as a Research officer to the New South Wales Minister for Sport and Recreation, Ken Booth. Gaining prominence within the ALP, he was made Assistant General Secretary of the NSW party in 1980, serving for nine years and became a member of the ALP National Executive in 1989.

Political career
A leading member of the Socialist Left faction of the ALP, Faulkner was appointed to the Senate in 1989 to succeed the former left-wing minister Arthur Gietzelt, who had resigned mid-term. In the Keating Labor government, Faulkner was Minister for Veterans' Affairs and Minister for Defence Science and Personnel 1993–94, and Minister for the Environment, Sport and Territories, with a seat in the Cabinet, 1994–96.

After the defeat of the Keating government in 1996, Faulkner became Leader of the Opposition in the Senate, and was a member of the Opposition Shadow Ministry 1996–2004. He was at various times Shadow Minister for Social Security, Public Administration and Home Affairs. He was a key Labor strategist in the 1998, 2001 and 2004 federal elections, and was a particularly close advisor to Mark Latham during the 2004 election. In the wake of Labor's defeat in that election, he resigned his positions. Faulkner became the first Labor Senate leader who did not become Government Senate leader since Don Willesee. In October 2006 John Faulkner was elected as the National President of the Australian Labor Party until February 2008 and chaired the Labor's National Conference in 2007.

In the First Rudd Ministry, Faulkner served as the Vice-President of the Executive Council, Special Minister of State and Cabinet Secretary. In his role he introduced new rules for ministerial conduct and fundraising aimed at reducing the influence of lobbyists on government decisions. He also introduced new guidelines reducing the overt political control of government funded advertising.

On 9 June 2009, Faulkner was sworn in the Minister for Defence, replacing Joel Fitzgibbon, who had stepped down on 4 June. He retained this portfolio in the First Gillard government until the 2010 federal election following an earlier announcement that he would step down as Defence Minister and return to the backbench.

In 2014 Faulkner began a process of reforms that sought to stamp out perceived corruption and factional infighting within the New South Wales branch of the Australian Labor Party. Faulkner proposed to include rankandfile members in decisions such as the selection of candidates for Senate and Legislative Council vacancies and party tickets, and a vote in the direct election of the New South Wales parliamentary leaders. However, Faulkner's reform proposals were mostly rejected at NSW Labor's 2014 conference. The direct election of party leader gained support with effect from after the 2015 election.

Resignation
Faulkner announced on 30 April 2014 that he would not seek re-election and would be retiring at the end of his term on 30 June 2017. On 11 December 2014, however, he announced that he would be resigning from the Senate in late January or early February 2015, creating a casual vacancy. Faulkner resigned on 6 February 2015.

Post-politics life
Faulkner has since been a member of the board of the Global Panel Foundation – Australasia – an NGO that works global in crisis areas.

Personal life
Faulkner was formerly married to fellow Labor politician Sandra Nori and they have two children.

Major published works

See also 
 Second Keating Ministry
 First Rudd Ministry
 First Gillard Ministry

References

External links
John Faulkner – Senator for New South Wales – ALP profile
 Summary of parliamentary voting for Senator John Faulkner on TheyVoteForYou.org.au

|-

|-

|-

|-

|-

|-

|-

1954 births
Australian Labor Party members of the Parliament of Australia
Australian republicans
Australian schoolteachers
Government ministers of Australia
Labor Left politicians
Living people
Macquarie University alumni
Members of the Australian Senate
Members of the Australian Senate for New South Wales
Members of the Cabinet of Australia
People from the Riverina
Delegates to the Australian Constitutional Convention 1998
20th-century Australian politicians
Defence ministers of Australia
21st-century Australian politicians